The Lima Penitentiary, also known simply as El Panóptico, was a prison building that existed in Lima, Peru. It had a panopticon layout, and was designed by Michele Trefogli and Maximiliano Mimey.

History
The penitentiary was built between 1856 and 1860, by order of President Ramón Castilla due to the lack of a prison system in the country. It was inaugurated in 1862. After a study carried out by Mariano Paz Soldán, the construction of the building was arranged by architects Michele Trefogli and Maximiliano Mimey. It was located south of the city, near the Guadalupe Gate of the Walls of Lima.

The front of the building reflected a severe architectural style, showing its reclusive purpose and trying to project an impregnable image, while the layout of the rooms inside included areas where prisoners worked during the day and cells where they were confined in the nights.

The building existed for more than 100 years and characters such as President Augusto B. Leguía were imprisoned there, confined there after the coup that removed him from power, although he did not die in prison but in the Bellavista Naval Hospital.

The prison operated until June 1961, later being demolished in August. Before its demolition, all inmates were moved out to El Frontón prison. In its place are currently the Lima Civic Center and the Sheraton Lima Hotel & Convention Center, which were built during the government of Juan Velasco Alvarado.

Notable inmates
 Augusto B. Leguía, President of Peru
 Ciro Alegría, journalist
 Delfín Lévano, anarchist
 Víctor Raúl Haya de la Torre, politician
 Jorge Villanueva Torres, a man convicted and executed in 1957 for the kidnapping, rape and murder of a young boy.

See also
Lima Civic Center
Sheraton Lima Historic Center

References

Defunct prisons in Peru
Buildings and structures in Lima
Demolished buildings and structures in Peru
Buildings and structures demolished in the 1960s